Jean-Claude Wicky (28 January 1946 – 31 July 2016) was a photographer noted for his series on Bolivian miners (1984–2001).

Biography
Wicky was born in 1946 in Moutier, Switzerland. His photos have been exhibited at the Swiss Foundation for Photography, the Musée de l'Élysée in Lausanne, and the Minneapolis Institute of Arts, as well as in magazines including GEO and Smithsonian Magazine.

He died 31 July 2016, in Biel, Switzerland, at age 70.

Works
Mineros, 2002,  (French),  (Spanish),  (German).

Films
Every Day is Night, 2010,

References

External links
Mountains of Pain—Abstract of Smithsonian article on the miners at Cerro Rico, illustrated with photographs by Wicky.
 The Mineros photography exhibition

1946 births
2016 deaths
Swiss photographers